Selena Forever is an American stage musical, based on the 1997 film Selena, that tells the life of the famous Tejano singer Selena Quintanilla-Pérez. The musical has been staged under two titles. The first, Selena Forever, was conceived with book and original lyrics by Edward Gallardo and original music by Fernando Rivas, as well as additional songs that were originally performed by Selena herself. The musical premiered at the San Antonio Municipal Auditorium before launching on an ill-fated 30-city tour. The musical was then restaged as Selena: A Musical Celebration of Life in Los Angeles.

Productions
In 1999, a new Broadway bound musical entitled Selena was announced to premier in San Antonio in March 2000 to commemorate the fifth anniversary of Selena's death. Broadway producers Tom Quinn, Jerry Frankel, Peter Fitzgerald and Michael Vega were soon on board to stage the musical. Later, librettist and lyricist Edward Gallardo was brought on to write the show's book and lyrics. Fernando Rivas was to compose the show's songs.

In 2000, Selena Forever was first produced for a 30-city national tour with a budget of over $2 million. After a national casting call, the producers cast Veronica Vasquez to portray Selena. The role was alternated by Rebecca Valdez.

The musical previewed on March 21 and opened on March 23 at the San Antonio Municipal Auditorium. It opened to mostly positive reviews.

The tour continued throughout Texas, including Corpus Christi and Houston along with four other stops. However, due to financial problems and poor ticket sales, the rest of the tour was canceled. The show closed on April 30 at the Rosemont Theatre in Chicago after performing in only in six cities. The tour, in total, ran from March 21 through April 30 after four previews and 56 regular performances. A cast recording was never produced.

Following the abrupt ending of the tour, in March 2001 Selena Forever was rewritten, reproduced and renamed under the title Selena: A Musical Celebration Of Life. Originally the show was to be directed by Daniel Valdez, who would also perform as Abraham. After a falling out with the producer, he left and was replaced by choreographer Miranda Garrison.

With a $1 million budget and after a week's delay, the production began previews on March 28, 2001 and opened on April 19, at the James Doolittle Theatre (now the Ricardo Montalban Theatre) in Los Angeles, California. Despite receiving harsh criticism, the show became a box office success. It was expected to close on May 27, but due to extremely high ticket sales, was extended by two weeks. The production closed in November of that same year, after over 200 performances.

Reception
Selena Forever was received positively by some critics. Deborah Martin of the San Antonio Express stated that the show would "appeal to hard-core Selena fans and musical theatre fans who are looking for something new." Ramiro Burr of Billboard magazine said that the show's musical numbers "deliver the hardest punches." Linda Emmerick of the Chicago Sun-Times noted the performance of the cast. Veronica Vasquez and Margo Reymundo, who played Selena's mother, were given critical acclaim for their roles. Mario Tarradell of the Dallas Morning News was less positive. He felt that the "legend is lost" in the production, despised the show's musical numbers, and felt that Selena and Broadway don't mix. However, he praised the cast's performances.

Musical numbers

Act I
 "A New Show's About to Begin" - Selena and Ensemble
 "The Ballad of Selena" - Los Sueños Del Pueblo
 "Somewhere Over the Rainbow" - Young Selena
 "Simply Me" - Young Selena
 "Blue Moon Memories" - Abraham
 "Abraham’s Dream" - Abraham, Marcella
 "Como La Flor" - Adult Selena
 "Papa Gayo’s" - Los Sueños Del Pueblo
 "Blue Moon" - Young Selena
 "Abraham’s Dream" (Reprise) - Abraham
 "Living On A Bus" (Medley) - Marcella and Company
 "Dame Un Beso" - Selena y Los Dinos
 "La Bamba" - Selena y Los Dinos
 "Guitar Solo" - Chris
 "Baila Esta Cumbia" - Selena y Los Dinos
 "I’ve Grown Up, Daddy" - Selena and Company
 "Somebody Special" - Suzette, Los Sueños Del Pueblo
 "Pizza & Coke" - Selena
 "Wanting a Dream" - A.B., Los Sueños Del Pueblo
 "My Daughter Wants to Be Just Like Selena" - Mothers
 "Techno Cumbia" - Daughters
 "Amor Prohibido" - Selena y Los Dinos
 "Como La Flor" - Selena y Los Dinos

Act II
 "God's Child (Baila Conmigo)" - Selena and Los Suenos Del Pueblo
 "Just Be Yourself, Selena" - Marcella, Suzette
 "Bidi Bidi Bom Bom" - Selena y Los Dinos
 "La Carcacha" - Selena y Los Dinos
 "To Him She’s a Woman" - Marcella
 "A New Contract" - A.B., Los Sueños Del Pueblo
 "Missing My Baby" - Selena y Los Dinos
 "Meet Me In Corpus Christi" - Chris
 "Tomorrow and Forever" - Chris, Selena
 "You’re Gonna Die Today, Brother" - A.B., Friends
 "Amame, Quiereme" - Suzette, Billy, Chorus
 "If Tomorrow" - Abraham
 "Dress Like Selena" - Suzette
 "The Fan Club/I Will Survive" - Los Sueños Del Pueblo and Selena
 "I Could Fall In Love" - Selena
 "The Fan Club" (Reprise) - Los Sueños Del Pueblo
 "Letters to Selena" - Women
 "The Next Morning" - José Behar
 "Dreaming of You" - Selena
 "Finale" - Company

Cast

Tour schedule

Original tour

Completed engagements
 San Antonio Municipal Auditorium: March 21 - March 26 (San Antonio, Texas)
 Music Hall at Fair Park: March 28 - April 2 (Dallas, Texas)
 Selena Auditorium: April 5 - April 7 (Corpus Christi, Texas)
 Don Haskins Center: April 13 - April 15 (El Paso, Texas)
 Jones Hall: April 18 - April 23 (Houston, Texas)
 Rosemont Theatre: April 25 - April 30 (Rosemont, Illinois)

Cancelled engagements
 Gammage Auditorium: May 2 - May 7 (Phoenix, Arizona)
 Wiltern Theatre: May 9 - May 14 (Los Angeles, California)
 Buell Hall: June 6 - June 11 (Denver, Colorado)
 San Diego Civic Center: June 13 - June 18 (San Diego, California)
 San Jose PAC: June 27 - July 2 (San Jose, California)

Revivals
 2001 Doolittle Theatre: March 28 - November 12 (Hollywood, California) monkey b@lls

References

External links
 Selena Forever official website

Cultural depictions of Selena
2000 musicals
2001 musicals
Musicals based on films
Biographical plays about musicians